Tophill is a suburb of Luton, in the north-west of the town, centred on Toddington Road, in the Luton district, in the ceremonial county of Bedfordshire, England. It is roughly bounded by the edge of Luton to the north, Brickly Road to the south, the M1 to the west, and the Midland Main Line to the east.

Tophill mostly consists of 1960s, 70s, and 80s suburban housing, and also includes the Toddington Road industrial estate and the Vauxhall Aftersales Warehouse.

Politics 
Tophill is part of Leagrave ward, which is represented by Cllr Waheed Akbar (Labour), Cllr Maria Lovell (Labour) and Cllr Sameera Saleem (Labour).

The ward forms part of the parliamentary constituency of Luton North and the MP is Sarah Owen (Labour).

References 

Areas of Luton